The men's plain high diving, also reported as plongeons de haut vol ordinaires (English: regular high diving), was one of five diving events on the diving at the 1924 Summer Olympics programme. The competition was actually held from both 10 metre and 5 metre platforms. The competitors performed four times a forward plain dive: two from the 10 metre and two from the 5 metre platforms. The competition was held on Monday 14 July 1924, and Tuesday 15 July 1924. Twenty-five divers from ten nations competed.

Results

First round

The three divers who scored the smallest number of points in each group of the first round advanced to the final.

Group 1

Group 2

Group 3

Final

References

Sources

Men
1924
Men's events at the 1924 Summer Olympics